Salvi may refer to:

Names

Given Name 
 Salvi (footballer) (born 1991), Spanish footballer
 Giovanni Battista Salvi da Sassoferrato (1609-1685), Italian painter
 Salvi Castellucci (1608-1672), Italian painter
 Salvius of Albi (or Sauve; fl. c. 580), bishop of Albi in Francia

Surname 
 Aavishkar Salvi (born 1981), Indian cricketer
 Abhijit Salvi (born 1992), Indian cricketer
 Al Salvi (born 1960), American politician
 Alessandro Salvi (born 1968), Italian footballer 
 Antonio Salvi (1664–1724), Italian poet and librettist
 Arnaldo Salvi (1915–2002), Italian professional football player.
 Cesare Salvi (born 1948), Italian politician
 Chris Salvi (born 1989), American football player
 Dattaji Salvi, leader of Shiv Sena and a trade unionist
 Deepak Salvi, criminal lawyer in the High Court of Bombay
 Enzo Salvi (born Vincenzo Salvi, in 1963), Italian actor
 Eugenia Salvi (born 1960), athlete from Italy competing in compound archery
 Francesco Salvi (born 1953), Italian actor, writer, comedian, singer and architect
 Gian Ercole Salvi, Italian athlete and than a manager of the Virtus Pallacanestro Bologna
 John Salvi (1972-1996), anti-abortion terrorist
 Julian Salvi (born 1985), Australian rugby union player
 Lorenzo Salvi (19th century), Italian opera singer
 Lorenzo Salvi, blessed (1782-1856),  Italian Roman Catholic priest and a professed member of the Passionists
 Luis Salvadores Salvi (1932-2014), Chilean basketball player
 Manasi Salvi (born 1980), Indian television and film actress
 Matteo Salvi (1816-1887), Italian composer
 Mirko Salvi (born 1994), Swiss professional footballer
 Nicola Salvi (1697-1751), Italian architect
 Paolo Salvi (1891-1945), Italian gymnast
 Pooja Salvi, Indian film actress and model
 Rajan Salvi, Indian politician two times deputy in the Maharashtra Legislative Assembly from 2009 
 Shankarrao Salvi (1931-2007), Indian Kabaddi player, coach and administrator
 Victor Salvi (1920–2015), Italian-American harpist and harp manufacturer

Others 
 Salvi a Brahman Hindu caste in Rajasthan, India
 Salvi Harps, Italian brand of concert harps

See also 
 Salvia (disambiguation)
 Salvini (disambiguation)
 Salvetti, a surname

Italian masculine given names